Henriette Maria of Brandenburg-Schwedt (2 March 1702 probably in Berlin – 7 May 1782 in Köpenick), was a granddaughter of the "Great Elector" Frederick William of Brandenburg.  She was the daughter of Philip William, Margrave of Brandenburg-Schwedt (1669-1711), the eldest son of the elector's second marriage with Sophia Dorothea of Schleswig-Holstein-Sonderburg-Glücksburg.  Her mother was Johanna Charlotte (1682-1750), the daughter of Prince John George II, Prince of Anhalt-Dessau.

Life 
She married on 8 December 1716 in Berlin to Hereditary Prince Frederick Louis of Württemberg (1698-1731), the only son of Duke Eberhard Louis of Württemberg.  The marriage produced two children:
 Eberhard Frederick (1718-1719)
 Louise Frederica (1721-1791), married Frederick II, Duke of Mecklenburg-Schwerin.

Henrietta Maria died on 7 May 1782, aged 81, and was buried in the crypt below the church of Köpenick Palace, where she had spent her years of widowhood.  Her daughter arranged for a black marble plate in the crypt to commemorate her mother.  In the 1960s, the coffin was cremated, with permission of the Hohenzollern family, and the formerly open-ended crypt (as described by Fontane) was walled off.  Her urn was buried below the black marble plate.

References 

 Theodor Fontane. Wanderungen durch die Mark Brandenburg. Volume 4 Spreeland. "An der Spree: Schloss Köpenick"

House of Hohenzollern
German princesses
1702 births
1782 deaths
18th-century German people
Daughters of monarchs